The Iraq national beach soccer team represents Iraq in international beach soccer competitions and is controlled by the Iraq Football Association, the governing body for football in Iraq.

Current squad
Correct as of March 2011

Coach: Fallah Zaboon

Achievements
FIFA Beach Soccer World Cup qualification (AFC) Best: Ninth place
2011

External links
 Iraq at IFA.iq
Iraq at BSWW
 Iraq at Beach Soccer Russia

Asian national beach soccer teams
Beach Soccer